As Allied troops entered and occupied German territory during the later stages of World War II, mass rapes of women took place both in connection with combat operations and during the subsequent occupation of Germany. Scholars agree that the majority of the rapes were committed by Soviet occupation troops. The wartime rapes were followed by decades of silence.

According to historian Antony Beevor, whose books were banned in 2015 from some Russian schools and colleges, NKVD (Soviet secret police) files have revealed that the leadership knew what was happening, but did little to stop it. It was often rear echelon units who committed the rapes. According to professor  Oleg Rzheshevsky, "4,148 Red Army officers and many privates were punished for committing atrocities". The exact number of German women and girls raped by Soviet troops during the war and occupation is uncertain, but historians estimate their numbers are likely in the hundreds of thousands, and possibly as many as two million.

Soviet troops
Sexual violence was committed by the armies of the Western Allies and the Red Army as their troops fought their way into the Third Reich and during the period of occupation. Mass rape by Soviet soldiers first began during the Battle of Romania and during the Budapest offensive in Hungary. 
On the territory of Nazi Germany, it began on 21 October 1944 when troops of the Red Army crossed the bridge over the Angerapp creek (marking the Germany–Poland border) and committed the Nemmersdorf massacre before they were beaten back a few hours later.

The majority of the assaults were committed in the Soviet occupation zone; estimates of the numbers of German women raped by Soviet soldiers have ranged up to 2 million. According to historian William Hitchcock, in many cases women were the victims of repeated rapes, some as many as 60 to 70 times. At least 100,000 women are believed to have been raped in Berlin, based on surging abortion rates in the following months and contemporary hospital reports, with an estimated 10,000 women dying in the aftermath. Female deaths in connection with the rapes in Germany, overall, are estimated at 240,000. Antony Beevor describes it as the "greatest phenomenon of mass rape in history" and concludes that at least 1.4 million women were raped in East Prussia, Pomerania and Silesia alone. According to the Soviet war correspondent Natalya Gesse, Soviet soldiers raped German females from eight to eighty years old. Soviet and Polish women were not spared either. When General Tsygankov, head of the political department of the First Ukrainian Front, reported to Moscow the mass rape of Soviet women deported to Germany for forced labour, he recommended that the women be prevented from describing their ordeal on their return to Russia.

When the Yugoslav Partisan politician Milovan Djilas complained about rapes in Yugoslavia, Joseph Stalin reportedly stated that he should "understand it if a soldier who has crossed thousands of kilometres through blood and fire and death has fun with a woman or takes some trifle". On another occasion, when told that Red Army soldiers sexually maltreated German refugees, he reportedly said: "We lecture our soldiers too much; let them have their initiative." Nevertheless, there are no surviving records to prove that rape was legally sanctioned.

Konstantin Rokossovsky issued order No 006 in an attempt to direct "the feelings of hatred at fighting the enemy on the battlefield", which had little effect. There were also several arbitrary attempts to exert authority. For example, the commander of one rifle division is said to have "personally shot a lieutenant who was lining up a group of his men before a German woman spreadeagled on the ground".

Studies
The historian Norman Naimark writes that after mid-1945, Soviet soldiers caught raping civilians were usually punished to some degree, which ranged from arrest to execution. The rapes continued until the winter of 1947–48, when the Soviet Military Administration in Germany finally confined Soviet Army troops to guard posts and camps strictly and to separate them from the residential population in the Soviet zone of Germany.

In his analysis of the motives behind the extensive Soviet rapes, Norman Naimark singles out "hate propaganda, personal experiences of suffering at home, and an allegedly fully demeaning picture of German women in the press, not to mention among the soldiers themselves" as some reasons for the widespread rapes. Naimark also noted the effect that tendency to binge-drink alcohol (of which much was available in Germany) had on the propensity of Soviet soldiers to commit rape, especially rape-murder. Naimark also notes the allegedly-patriarchal nature of Russian culture and of the Asian societies constituting the Soviet Union, where dishonor had been repaid by raping the women of the enemy. The fact that the Germans had a much higher standard of living visible even when in ruins "may well have contributed allegedly to a national inferiority complex among Russians". Combining "Russian feelings of inferiority", the resulting need to restore honor, and their desire for revenge may be reasons for why many women were raped in public as well as in front of husbands before both were killed.

According to Antony Beevor, revenge was not the only reason for the frequent rapes, but the Soviet troops' feeling of entitlement to all types of spoils of war, including women, was an important factor as well. Beevor exemplifies that with his discovery that Soviet troops also raped Soviet and Polish girls and women that were liberated from Nazi concentration camps as well as those who were held for forced labour at farms and factories. The rapes were often perpetrated by rear echelon units.

The description of the events by Beevor was challenged by Makhmut Gareev, who said the work by Beevor was worse than Joseph Goebbels's propaganda. According to Russian Professor Oleg Rzheshevsky, 4,148 Red Army officers and "a significant number" of soldiers were convicted of atrocities for crimes committed against German civilians.

Richard Overy, a historian from King's College London, has criticised the viewpoint put forth by the Russians by asserting that they refuse to acknowledge Soviet war crimes committed during the war: "Partly this is because they felt that much of it was justified vengeance against an enemy who committed much worse, and partly it was because they were writing the victors' history."

Geoffrey Roberts writes that the Red Army raped women in every country they passed through but mostly in Austria and Germany: 70,000–100,000 rapes in Vienna, and "hundreds of thousands" of rapes in Germany. He notes that the German Army probably committed tens of thousands of rapes on the Eastern Front but that murder was the more typical crime for them.

In 2015, Beevor's books were banned and censored in some Russian schools and colleges.

Eyewitness accounts
A documentary book, War's Unwomanly Face by Svetlana Alexievich, includes memories by Soviet veterans about their experience in Germany. According to a former army officer, "We were young, strong, and four years without women. So we tried to catch German women and.... Ten men raped one girl. There were not enough women; the entire population run from the Soviet Army. So we had to take young, twelve or thirteen year-old. If she cried, we put something into her mouth. We thought it was fun. Now I can not understand how I did it. A boy from a good family.... But that was me." A woman telephone operator from the Soviet Army recalled: "When we occupied every town, we had first three days for looting and ... [rapes]. That was unofficial of course. But after three days one could be court-martialed for doing this.... I remember one raped German woman laying naked, with hand grenade between her legs. Now I feel shame, but I did not feel shame back then.... Do you think it was easy to forgive [the Germans]? We hated to see their clean undamaged white houses. With roses. I wanted them to suffer. I wanted to see their tears. Decades had to pass until I started feeling pity for them." While serving as an artillery officer in East Prussia, Aleksandr Solzhenitsyn witnessed war crimes against local German civilians by Soviet military personnel. Of the atrocities, Solzhenitsyn wrote: "You know very well that we've come to Germany to take our revenge."

Atina Grossman in her article in "October" describes how until early 1945, the abortions in Germany were illegal except for medical and eugenic reasons and so doctors opened up and started performing abortions to rape victims for which only an affidavit was requested from a woman. It was also typical that women specified their reasons for abortions as being mostly socio-economic (inability to raise another child), rather than moral or ethical. Many women stated they were raped but their accounts described the rapist as looking Asian or Mongolian. German women uniformly described the rapists as of   "of Mongolian or Asiatic type".
Evidence of Central Asian troops committing rape in Berlin was recorded. In April 1945, Magda Wieland took shelter in the cellar of her apartment house. She described that the first Soviet soldier to find her was a young 16 year-old Central Asian male, who raped her. It was reported that a Soviet commander was greatly embarrassed by wholesale rape of German women by ethnic Kazakh soldiers who were by far the worse offenders and were described as being Mongol Hordes. Another recorded case involves German director Schmidt, who burst into Villa Franka, and yelled at Russian commander Isayev "Your soldiers are raping German women!". The raped German victim pointed at a Kazakh soldier being the perpetrator, and was arrested at the spot. The Kazakh soldier in return claimed he wanted revenge against the Germans who killed his two brothers in battle.

The first Soviet troops to fight in Berlin consisted mostly of Mongolians. Even the young German-Jewish fugitive Inge Deutschkron, described her first "Russian" as small, with crooked legs and "a typical mongolian face with almond eyes and high cheekbones".

Accounts of rape of German women by the Mongolians were also recorded. For example, a letter from July 24, 1945 by a German female victim stated:

I hereby certify that at the end of April this year during the Russian march into Berlin I was raped in a loathsome way by two Red Army soldiers of Mongol/Asiatic type.

Eyewitness testimony from females in the Battle of Berlin also described Soviet soldiers of Mongolian type:

The next morning, we women proceeded to make ourselves look as unattractive as possible to the Soviets by smearing our faces with coal dust and covering our heads with old rags, our make-up for the Ivan. We huddled together in the central part of the basement, shaking with fear, while some peeked through the low basement windows to see what was happening on the Soviet-controlled street. We felt paralyzed by the sight of these husky Mongolians, looking wild and frightening. At the ruin across the street from us the first Soviet orders were posted, including a curfew. Suddenly there was a shattering noise outside. Horrified, we watched the Soviets demolish the corner grocery store and throw its contents, shelving and furniture out into the street. Urgently needed bags of flour, sugar and rice were split open and spilled their contents on the bare pavement, while Soviet soldiers stood guard with their rifles so that no one would dare to pick up any of the urgently needed food. This was just unbelievable. At night, a few desperate people tried to salvage some of the spilled food from the gutter. Hunger now became a major concern because our ration cards were worthless with no hope of any supplies.

A woman who lived in Berlin recalled:

The front-line Russian troops who did the fighting – as a woman, you didn't have to be afraid of them. They shot every man they saw, even old men and young boys, but they left the women alone. It was the ones who came afterwards, the second echelon, who were the worst. They did all the raping and plundering. They stripped homes of every single possession, right down to the toilets.

Social effects
The exact number of German women and girls raped by Soviet troops during the war and occupation is uncertain, but western historians estimate their numbers are likely in the hundreds of thousands and possibly as many as two million. The number of babies, who came to be known as "Russian Children", born as a result is unknown. However, most rapes did not result in pregnancies, and many pregnancies did not result in the victims giving birth. Abortions were the preferred choice of rape victims, and many died as a consequence of internal injuries after being brutally violated, or due to untreated sexually transmitted diseases because of a lack of medicine or badly-performed abortions. Many women committed suicide after rape, mostly due to being unable to cope with their traumatic experience, although some were forced to by their fathers because of their "dishonor", while others were shot and killed by their husbands for "consenting to sexual relations with Allied soldiers". Many German women were verbally abused by German soldiers on the streets or in their homes for being "Allied whores", while a lot of them even received threatening letters from German men. In addition, many children died in postwar Germany as a result of widespread starvation, scarce supplies and diseases such as typhus and diphtheria. The infant mortality in Berlin reached up to 90%.

As for the social effects of the sexual violence, Norman Naimark noted:

West Berliners and women of the wartime generation refer to the Soviet War Memorial in Treptower Park, Berlin, as the "tomb of the unknown rapist" in response to the mass rapes by Red Army soldiers in 1945 during and after the Battle of Berlin.

Hannelore Kohl, the former wife of former West German Chancellor Helmut Kohl, had been gang-raped at the age of 12 by Soviet soldiers in May 1945, according to her biographer. As a consequence, she sustained a serious lifelong back injury after she had been thrown out of a first-floor window. She suffered long and serious illnesses, which experts thought to be the consequences of childhood trauma. Hannelore Kohl took her own life in 2001.

In Soviet literature
Initially, East German and Soviet propaganda suggested that most of the rapes were being conducted by Germans disguised as Soviet soldiers, including Werwolf battalions. Aleksandr Solzhenitsyn took part in the invasion of Germany and wrote a poem about it, "Prussian Nights". Parts of the poem read, "Twenty-two Hoeringstrasse. It's not been burned, just looted, rifled. A moaning by the walls, half muffled: the mother's wounded, half alive. The little daughter's on the mattress, dead. How many have been on it? A platoon, a company perhaps? A girl's been turned into a woman, a woman turned into a corpse.... The mother begs, 'Soldier, kill me! Records of sexual violence were found in works of other Soviet authors, mostly in the form of war memoirs mentioning particular incidents witnessed by the authors, such as Lev Kopelev, Vladimir Gelfand, Mikhail Koryakov, Eugenii Plimak, David Samoilow, Boris Slutskii, Nikolay Nikulin, Grigorii Pomerants, Leonid Ryabichev and Vassily Grossman. Vera Dubina and Oleg Budnitskii were among those few historians who investigated the subject more systematically.

In popular culture
As most women recoiled from their experiences and had no desire to recount them, most biographies and depictions of the period, like the 2004 German film Downfall, alluded to mass rape by the Red Army but stopped shy of mentioning it explicitly. As time has progressed, more works have been produced that have directly addressed the issue, such as the books The 158-Pound Marriage and My Story (1961) by Gemma LaGuardia Gluck [reissued as Fiorello's Sister: Gemma La Guardia Gluck's Story (Religion, Theology, and the Holocaust) (2007, Expanded Edition)], or the 2006 films Joy Division and The Good German.

The topic is the subject of much feminist discourse. The first autobiographical work depicting the events was the groundbreaking 1954 book A Woman in Berlin, which was made into a 2008 feature film. It was widely rejected in Germany after its initial publication but has seen a new acceptance, and many women have found inspiration to come forward with their own stories.

U.S. troops
In Taken by Force, J. Robert Lilly estimates the number of rapes committed by U.S. servicemen in Germany to be 11,040. However, extensive research by German historian Miriam Gebhardt suggests a number as high as 190,000 (or roughly 5% of the estimated post-war births in Germany) due to rape by American soldiers.  Accounts from the time period point to years of sexual violence in both East and West Germany.  The violence targeted girls as young as 7 and women as old as 69.  Stories such as Eine Frau in Berlin include firsthand accounts of German women volunteering to coerced relationships with Allied soldiers in exchange for protection from other soldiers.  As in the case of the American occupation of France after the D-Day invasion, many of the American rapes in Germany in 1945 were gang rapes committed by armed soldiers at gunpoint.

Although policies against fraternization were instituted for the Americans in Germany, the phrase "copulation without conversation is not fraternization" was used as a motto by United States Army troops. The journalist Osmar White, a war correspondent from Australia who served with the American troops during the war, wrote: 

A typical victimization with sexual assault by drunken American personnel marching through occupied territory involved threatening a German family with weapons, forcing one or more women to engage in sex, and putting the entire family out on the street afterward.

As in the eastern sector of the occupation, the number of rapes peaked in 1945, but a high rate of violence against the German and Austrian populations by the Americans lasted at least into the first half of 1946, with five cases of dead German women found in American barracks in May and June 1946 alone.

Carol Huntington wrote that the American soldiers who raped German women and then left gifts of food for them may have permitted themselves to view the act as prostitution rather than rape. Citing the work of a Japanese historian alongside that suggestion, Huntington writes that Japanese women who begged for food "were raped and soldiers sometimes left food for those they raped."

White American soldiers in Germany were responsible for mass rapes, but the Black soldiers of America's segregated occupation force were both more likely to be charged with rape and severely punished. Heide Fehrenbach writes that while the American Black soldiers were in fact by no means free from indiscipline, 

In 2015, the German news magazine Der Spiegel reported that German historian Miriam Gebhardt "believes that members of the US military raped as many as 190,000 German women by the time West Germany regained sovereignty in 1955, with most of the assaults taking place in the months immediately following the US invasion of Nazi Germany. The author bases her claims in large part on reports kept by Bavarian priests in the summer of 1945." However the author of the Der Spiegel article concluded her total "is an extrapolation" which "hardly seems plausible" and is "unlikely".

British troops
Sean Longden states that while not on the scale of the Red Army in the Soviet Zone, the British Military Police regularly investigated reports of rape. However the numbers were small compared to the number of desertions:

Longden mentions that some rapes were carried out by soldiers either suffering from post traumatic stress or who were drunk, but that these were not considered as serious as the less common premeditated crimes.

Longden mentions that on 16 April 1945, three women in Neustadt am Rübenberge were raped, however he does not make clear if this was one incident or three separate ones. He also does not make clear if they were spontaneous or premeditated. He gives an example of a premeditated rape: In the village of Oyle, near Nienburg, an attempted rape of two local girls at gunpoint by two soldiers ended in the death of one of the girls when, whether intentionally or not, one of the soldiers shot her. In a third example, Longden highlights that not all British officers were willing to punish their men. When a German woman reported a rape to a British Army medic, two British soldiers were identified by the woman in a line up as the perpetrators, but their commanding officer declined to take any action because "they were going on leave".

Clive Emsley quotes a senior British Army chaplain as reporting that there was "a good deal of rape going on, those who suffer [rape] have probably deserved it". However, he adds that probably referred to attacks by former slave labourers (displaced persons) seeking revenge. Longden also mentions such incidents and highlights that for a time Hanover, in the British zone, was in a state of anarchy with displaced persons raping and murdering German civilians. Initially when German family members approached the overstretched British authorities about murders they were told "we only have time for living people here".

French troops
French troops took part in the invasion of Germany, and France was assigned an occupation zone in Germany. Perry Biddiscombe quotes the original survey estimates that the French for instance committed "385 rapes in the Constance area; 600 in Bruchsal; and 500 in Freudenstadt." French Army soldiers were alleged to have committed widespread rape in the Höfingen District near Leonberg. Katz and Kaiser, though they mention rape, found no specific occurrences in either Höfingen or Leonberg compared to other towns.

According to Norman Naimark, French Moroccan troops matched the behaviour of Soviet troops when it came to rape, in particular in the early occupation of Baden and Württemberg, provided the numbers are correct.

German academic historians at Jena and Magdeburg contend that only France supported the children of her occupying armies resulted from the mass rape of German women. In the four occupied zones, however, many children of German mothers were ignored their entire lives. Children of French troops were regarded as French citizens. At least 1,500 children in France and her colonies were given up for adoption. Others never overcame the apparent flaw, while some "occupation children" gradually made their way in the divided society of Germany.

Discourse
It has been frequently repeated that the wartime rapes were surrounded by decades of silence or, until relatively recently, ignored by academics, with the prevailing attitude being that the Germans were the perpetrators of war crimes, Soviet writings speaking only of Russian liberators and German guilt and Western historians focusing on specific elements of the Holocaust.

In postwar Germany, especially in West Germany, the wartime rape stories became an essential part of political discourse and that the rape of German women, along with the expulsion of Germans from the East and the Allied occupation, had been universalized in an attempt to situate the German population on the whole as victims. However, it has been argued that it was not a "universal" story of women being raped by men but of German women being abused and violated by an army, which fought Nazi Germany and liberated death camps.

See also
 Comfort women
 Fury
 German military brothels in World War II
 Marta Hillers
 Marocchinate—rape after the Battle of Monte Cassino
 Prostitutes in South Korea for the U.S. military
 Rape during the liberation of France
 Rape during the liberation of Poland (1944–1947)
 Rape during the occupation of Japan
 Rape during the Bangladesh Liberation War
 Recreation and Amusement Association
 Soviet war crimes
 Stunde Null
 United States war crimes
 War crimes of the Wehrmacht#Rape
 Wartime sexual violence
 A Woman in Berlin

Citations

Cited and general sources 
  (Translated from original edition in Russian)  Note: citations in text are given in reference to the Russian edition.
 
 
 

1940s crimes in Germany
Allied occupation of Germany
Occupation
Violence against women in Germany
Wartime sexual violence
Wartime sexual violence in World War II
History of women in Germany
Women in Berlin